Agneepath is a TV serial that first aired on DD National.

Plot 
The show is based on the story of 5 fiery women's lives.  All of these women's are fighting for different purposes.  First one is an illegitimate child, whose father gets remarried and ignores her, second is from a broken home, third is a fatherless child, whose father leaves her mother when she was a child, fourth is a daughter of an educationist, who studies really hard to accomplish her dreams and the fifth is an Australian, daughter of ambitious parents, who is little cranky.  All of these five girls are like five rivers, who are destined to fall into the Ocean of fire.  The question is will they be able to change the destiny? But they are determined.

Cast 
 Kiran Kumar as Vishal Mehra
 Zarina Wahab
 Avtar Gill
 Pankaj Berry
 Suchitra Pillai
 Sulabha Arya
  Imran Khan
 Amita Nangia
 Nikhil Khera

External links
 TV Asia - http://www.tvasiausa.com 
 Unitech Indraprestha TV LTD - https://web.archive.org/web/20070520011119/http://www.unitechiptv.com/www/earlier.html

DD National original programming
Indian television soap operas
2006 Indian television series debuts